Tom Bourke (4 April 1918 – 29 December 2001) was an Australian rugby league footballer who played in the 1930s and 1940s. A New South Wales representative centre, he played his club football in Sydney for Balmain who he captained, and with whom he won several premierships. During his career he was described as, "one of the heaviest tacklers playing rugby league."

Playing career
Bourke progressed through Balmain's junior ranks before debuting in first grade in the 1939 NSWRFL season. Later that year he played in his first grand final, scoring two tries in his team's victory over South Sydney.

At the end of the 1944 NSWRFL season Patton captained Balmain from the wing in the grand final against Newtown, winning 12–8. Succeeding Arthur Patton as Balmain captain for the 1945 NSWRFL season, Patton again lead them to the grand final which was narrowly lost to Eastern Suburbs. He led Balmain to successive premierships in 1946 (kicking two goals) and 1947 (playing at lock). He captained Balmain to the 1948 NSWRFL season's grand final, hoping to make it three premierships in a row to equal Souths' record of eleven premierships. He scored his team's lone try and goal, but Balmain were beaten by Wests.

In 1949 Bourke left Sydney and took on a position of captain-coach in Griffith, New South Wales.

Post-playing
After his retirement from the playing field, Bourke continued his association with the Balmain club through coaching and as a selector. He died in 2001, aged 83.

In 2003 Bourke was named in the Balmain Tigers team of the century. and was thus one of the inaugural inductees of the Balmain Tigers Hall of Fame in 2005.

References

1918 births
2001 deaths
Sportsmen from New South Wales
Australian rugby league administrators
Australian rugby league players
Australian rugby league coaches
Rugby league players from New South Wales
Balmain Tigers players
New South Wales rugby league team players
Rugby league centres